The Federal Accreditation Service (RusAccreditation) is a federal body that develops and carries out the standards of accreditation of legal bodies in the Russian Federation. It was formed on January 24, 2011 as part of Russia's Ministry of Economic Development.

References

External links 
 Official website 

2011 establishments in Russia
Government agencies established in 2011
Government agencies of Russia